Aldersladum sodwanum is a species of the genus Aldersladum

References 

Aquatic organisms
Animals described in 1993
Alcyoniidae